Mauritiella armata is a species of flowering plant in the family Arecaceae. It is found in South America.

References

Trees of Peru
Trees of Ecuador
Trees of Brazil
Trees of Guyana
Trees of Venezuela
Trees of Suriname
Trees of Bolivia
Trees of Colombia
Calamoideae